Tog Wajaale (also known as Wajaale) is a city on the border of Somaliland and Ethiopia. Tog Wajaale is the main border crossing for goods coming in and out of Somaliland, primarily from the port city of Berbera, Somaliland's main port.

Demographics
The city of Wajaale has a total population of around 70,450 inhabitants. According to the 2007 census conducted by the Central Statistical Agency of Ethiopia (CSA) the Ethiopian part of the town had a population of 14,438.

Geography 
Wajale is located the border of Somaliland and Ethiopia. 92.8 km west of Hargeisa, the capital of Somaliland. It is in the south west of Kalabaydh town, on the west by the Awdal region, on the east by the Gabiley, Hargeisa City, and on the south by the Somali Region of Ethiopia.

Geographical coordinates are 9° 34' 0" North, 43° 29' 0" East

Education 
Primary schools, Secondary schools and University education is available throughout the district.[5]

Primary schools

 Number of Primary Schools – 17
Secondary schools
 Number of Secondary Schools – 2

Notable people 

 Ahmed Hassan Awke (1948 - 16 November 2015) - veteran Somali journalist

References

Populated places in Maroodi Jeex
Populated places in the Somali Region
Ethiopia–Somaliland border crossings